Pharmacological Research is a monthly peer-reviewed scientific journal covering pharmacology. It was established in 1969 as Pharmacological Research Communications, obtaining its current name in 1989. It is published by Elsevier and the editor-in-chief is Emilio Clementi (University of Milan). According to the Journal Citation Reports, the journal has a 2021 impact factor of 10.334.

References

External links 

Monthly journals
Elsevier academic journals
Pharmacology journals
Publications established in 1969
English-language journals